Powell Island is a narrow island  long and  wide, lying between Coronation and Laurie Islands in the central part of the South Orkney Islands of Antarctica. Its southern end lies 7 km east of the south-western extremity of Coronation Island, between Lewthwaite Strait and Washington Strait.

History
The island was discovered in the course of the joint cruise by Captains George Powell and Nathaniel Palmer in December 1821. It was correctly charted, though unnamed, on Powell's map published in 1822; it was subsequently named for Powell on an Admiralty chart of 1839.

Birds
An area including part of southern Powell Island (south of John Peaks on Coronation Island), along with neighbouring Christoffersen, Fredriksen, Michelsen and Grey Islands, with some other (unnamed) islands lying offshore, has been identified as a 2688 ha Important Bird Area (IBA) by BirdLife International as it supports several significant seabird breeding colonies. The boundary of the IBA is defined by the boundary of Antarctic Specially Protected Area (ASPA) 111.

See also
 Ellefsen Harbour
 Falkland Harbour
 List of Antarctic and subantarctic islands

References

 
Islands of the South Orkney Islands
Seabird colonies
Penguin colonies